Massachusetts House of Representatives' 6th Worcester district in the United States is one of 160 legislative districts included in the lower house of the Massachusetts General Court. It covers part of Worcester County. Republican Peter Durant of Spencer has represented the district since 2011.

Towns represented
The district includes the following localities:
 part of Charlton
 Dudley
 Southbridge
 part of Spencer

The current district geographic boundary overlaps with those of the Massachusetts Senate's Worcester and Norfolk district and Worcester, Hampden, Hampshire and Middlesex district.

Former locales
The district previously covered:
 Bolton, circa 1872 
 Harvard, circa 1872 
 Lancaster, circa 1872

Representatives
 James Bennett, circa 1858 
 Amasa Norcross, circa 1858-1859 
 Samuel Osgood, circa 1858 
 Charles L. Josselyn, circa 1859 
 Edwin Upton, circa 1859 
 Luther Hill, circa 1888 
 Louis Adelard Breault, circa 1920 
 Charles J. Skladzien, circa 1951 
 William A. Starzec, circa 1975 
 Marilyn Travinski, 1983–1991
 David M. Peters
 Mark J. Carron
 Geraldo Alicea
 Peter J. Durant, 2011–current

See also
 List of Massachusetts House of Representatives elections
 Other Worcester County districts of the Massachusetts House of Representatives: 1st, 2nd, 3rd, 4th, 5th, 7th, 8th, 9th, 10th, 11th, 12th, 13th, 14th, 15th, 16th, 17th, 18th
 Worcester County districts of the Massachusett Senate: 1st, 2nd; Hampshire, Franklin and Worcester; Middlesex and Worcester; Worcester, Hampden, Hampshire and Middlesex; Worcester and Middlesex; Worcester and Norfolk
 List of Massachusetts General Courts
 List of former districts of the Massachusetts House of Representatives

Images
Portraits of legislators

References

External links
 Ballotpedia
  (State House district information based on U.S. Census Bureau's American Community Survey).

House
Government in Worcester County, Massachusetts